Damien Brown may refer to:
 Damien Brown (soccer) (born 1975), Australian football player
 Damien Brown (fighter) (born 1984), Australian mixed martial artist

See also
 Damian Brown (born 1970), Australian weightlifter
 Damian Browne (born 1980), Irish rugby union player